Lee Alexander Barrow (born 1 May 1973) is an English former professional footballer who played in the Football League for Scarborough and Torquay United. He became player-manager of Midland Football Alliance club Heather St John's in 2013.

Playing career
Barrow began his career as an apprentice with Notts County, turning professional in July 1991, though in August 1992 he moved to Scarborough having not yet made his league debut. After only 11 games for Scarborough, Barrow moved to Torquay United in February 1993, soon establishing himself as a first-team regular.

In September 1997, he moved to League of Wales side Barry Town for a fee of £7,500, very quickly becoming a firm favourite amongst the Barry supporters. In the 2000 close-season, after 3 very successful seasons at Barry where he played in Europe and won two Welsh league titles, he moved to Aberystwyth Town remaining with the Parc Avenue side until December 2001 when he joined Hednesford Town.

He moved to Stafford Rangers in June 2002, but in December 2003 returned to Hednesford, making his Hednesford debut on 26 December against Stafford Rangers. He left Hednesford in July 2006, joining Leek Town.

After a spell at Kidsgrove, he joined Rushall Olympic in 2007 and later Gresley of the East Midlands Counties League in March 2011.

Honours
Hednesford Town
FA Trophy: 2003–04

References

External links

1973 births
Living people
People from Belper
Footballers from Derbyshire
English footballers
Notts County F.C. players
Scarborough F.C. players
Torquay United F.C. players
Barry Town United F.C. players
Aberystwyth Town F.C. players
Stafford Rangers F.C. players
Hednesford Town F.C. players
Leek Town F.C. players
Kidsgrove Athletic F.C. players
Rushall Olympic F.C. players
Mickleover Sports F.C. players
Gresley F.C. players
Heather St John's F.C. players
English Football League players
Cymru Premier players
English football managers
Association football defenders